Jordan Burke is a rugby league footballer who played for the Warrington Wolves in the Super League. He made his first team début in the 2012 Challenge Cup tie against Keighley Cougars.  For the 2013 season he was one of six Wolves players to sign for Championship club Swinton Lions under the dual registration rules.

References

Warrington Wolves players
English rugby league players
Rugby league fullbacks
1991 births
Living people
Swinton Lions players